Marius Tru Berenis (born March 4, 1973 in Vilnius, Lithuania) is a Lithuanian radio and television personality, musician and actor. He is the founder and a former member of the Lithuanian pop-rock group Žas.

References

External links
 Band Website
 Lithuanian News Articles
 Photos
 Lithuanian Wiki
 Radio Station Lietus

1973 births
Living people
Lithuanian musicians
Lithuanian male actors
Male actors from Vilnius